I'll Walk with God is a studio album by Slim Whitman, released in 1959 on Imperial Records.

Release history 
The album was issued in the United States by Imperial Records as a 12-inch long-playing record, catalog numbers LP 9088 (mono) and LP 12032 (stereo).

Track listing

References 

1959 albums
Slim Whitman albums
Imperial Records albums
Christian music albums